Slater Nelson "Dugie" Martin Jr. (October 22, 1925 – October 18, 2012) was an American professional basketball player and coach who was a playmaking guard for 11 seasons in the National Basketball Association (NBA). He was born in Elmina, Walker County, Texas and played in seven NBA All-Star Games.

Martin was one of the NBA's best defensive players in the 1950s, playing for the George Mikan-led Minneapolis Lakers that won four NBA championships between 1950 and 1954.   In 1956, he joined Bob Pettit's St. Louis Hawks and won another NBA title in 1958.

Martin was an alumnus of Jefferson Davis High School in Houston, where he led his school to two state basketball championships in 1942 and 1943.  He is also a graduate of University of Texas at Austin, where he set a scoring record in 1949 with 49 points in a game for the Longhorns against Texas Christian University (or TCU). Throughout his career with the Longhorns, he averaged 12.7 points per game. His former high school now holds an annual fund raiser in his name, the "Slater Martin Golf Tournament", which successfully raises tens of thousands of dollars each year for high school student clubs and athletic teams.

He was head coach of the Houston Mavericks of the American Basketball Association in the 1967–68 season and part of 1968–69, and led the Mavericks into the 1968 ABA Playoffs.

Martin was inducted into the Naismith Memorial Basketball Hall of Fame on May 3, 1982, in Springfield, Massachusetts. He is the only Longhorn to be so honored. His jersey number 15 was retired by the University of Texas on January 31, 2009, making him only the second Longhorn basketball player to have his number retired.

He died of a brief illness on October 18, 2012, in Houston, Texas, aged 86.

NBA career statistics

Regular season

Playoffs

See also
List of NBA players with most championships

References

External links

 
  NBA.com profile
 Slater Martin player statistics at Basketball-Reference.com
 Slater Martin coach statistics at Basketball-Reference.com

1925 births
2012 deaths
All-American college men's basketball players
American men's basketball coaches
American men's basketball players
Basketball coaches from Texas
Basketball players from Houston
Houston Mavericks coaches
Minneapolis Lakers players
Naismith Memorial Basketball Hall of Fame inductees
National Basketball Association All-Stars
National Collegiate Basketball Hall of Fame inductees
New York Knicks players
People from Walker County, Texas
Player-coaches
Point guards
Sportspeople from Houston
St. Louis Hawks head coaches
St. Louis Hawks players
Texas Longhorns men's basketball players